The Nigeria Union of Railwaymen (NUR) is a trade union representing workers in the rail industry in Nigeria.

The union was founded in 1978, when the Government of Nigeria merged five unions:

 Association of Locomotive Drivers, Firemen, Yard Staff and Allied Workers' Union
 National Union of Railway Workers of Nigeria
 Nigerian Railway Permanent Way Workers' Union
 Railway and Ports Transport and Clerical Staff Union of Nigeria
 Railway Technical Staff Association of Nigeria

The union was a founding affiliate of the Nigeria Labour Congress, and by 1988, it had 20,634 members.  In 2016, the union left the NLC to become a founding constituent of the United Labour Congress (ULC).  However, in 2020, the whole ULC rejoined the NLC.

References

Railway labor unions
Trade unions established in 1978
Trade unions in Nigeria